USS O-5 (SS-66) was one of 16 O-class submarines built for the United States Navy during World War I.

Description
The O-class submarines were designed to meet a Navy requirement for coastal defense boats. They displaced  on the surface and  submerged. The O-class submarines had a crew of 29 officers and enlisted men.

For surface running, the boats were powered by two  NELSECO diesel engines, each driving one propeller shaft. When submerged each propeller was driven by a  New York Navy Yard electric motor. Power for the two electric motors is provided by a pair of 60-cell batteries. They could reach  on the surface and  underwater.

The boats were armed with four 18 inch (450 mm)  torpedo tubes in the bow. They carried four reloads, for a total of eight torpedoes. The O-class submarines were also armed with a single retractable 3"/50 caliber deck gun.

Construction and career
O-5 was laid down on 8 December 1916 by the Fore River Shipbuilding Company of Quincy, Massachusetts. She was launched on 11 November 1917, and commissioned on 8 June 1918 with Lieutenant commander George A. Trever in command. During the final months of World War I, O-5 operated along the Atlantic coast and patrolled from Cape Cod to Key West, Florida. On October 6, 1918 O-5 was at the Brooklyn Navy Yard when Lieutenant (Junior Grade) William J. Sharkey noticed that the submarine's batteries were giving off toxic gas.  Sharkey informed his commanding officer and the two went forward in the submarine to investigate.  The batteries then exploded killing LTJG Sharkey and fatally injuring LCDR Trevor.  LTJG Sharkey was posthumously awarded the Navy Cross. O-5 departed Newport, Rhode Island on 3 November 1918 with a 20-submarine contingent bound for European waters; however, hostilities had ceased before the vessels reached the Azores.

After the Armistice with Germany, O-5 operated out of the Submarine School at New London, Connecticut until 1923. O-5 then sailed to Coco Solo, Panama Canal Zone, for a brief tour. On 28 October, as O-5 entered Limon Bay, preparatory to transiting the Panama Canal, she was rammed by the United Fruit Company steamer Abangarez and sank in less than a minute. Three men died; 16 others escaped Two crewmembers, Henry Breault and Lawrence Brown, were trapped in the forward torpedo room, which they sealed against the flooding of the submarine. Local engineers and divers were able to rig cranes and other equipment and lift O-5 far enough off the bottom that the bow broke the surface, exposing a hatch which led to the compartment where the two men were trapped, allowing them to be freed. Henry Breault was awarded the Medal of Honor for his actions.

Struck from the Naval Vessel Register on 28 April 1924, she was raised and later sold as a hulk to R.K. Morris in Balboa, Panama, on 12 December 1924. The sinking made O-5 valueless for future naval service. She was stripped of valuable fittings and equipment when sold for $3,125. Her original cost had been $638,000.

Recovery of O-5
On 28 October 1923, O-5 was operating with other units of the U.S. Atlantic Fleet under the command of Commander Submarine Force, Coco Solo, Canal Zone. At approximately 0630, O-5, under the command of Lieutenant Harrison Avery, was underway across Limon Bay toward the entrance to the Panama Canal. The steamship SS Abangarez, owned by the United Fruit Company and captained by Master W.A. Card, was underway toward Dock No. 6 at Cristobal. Through a series of maneuvering errors and miscommunication, the SS Abangarez collided with the O-5 and struck the submarine on the starboard side of the control room, opening a hole some ten feet long and penetrating the number one main ballast tank. The submarine rolled sharply to port – then back to starboard – and sank bow first in 42 feet of water.

Salvage efforts began immediately, and divers were sent down from a salvage tug that arrived from Coco Solo. By 10:00am, they were on the bottom examining the wreck. To search for trapped personnel, they hammered on the hull near the aft end of the ship and worked forward. Upon reaching the torpedo room, they heard answering hammer blows from inside the boat. In 1923 the only way the salvage crew could get the men out of the submarine was to lift it physically from the mud using cranes or pontoons. One of the largest crane barges in the world, Ajax, built specifically for handling the gates of the canal locks, was in the Canal Zone. However, there had been a landslide at the famous Gaillard Cut and Ajax was on the other side of the slide, assisting in clearing the Canal. The excavation shifted into high gear and by 2:00pm on the afternoon of the sinking, the crane barge Ajax squeezed through and was on its way to the O-5 site.

Divers worked to tunnel under O-5s bow so lifting cables could be attached. Ajax arrived about midnight, and by early morning, the cable tunnel had been dug, the cable run, and a lift was attempted.    Sheppard J. Shreaves, supervisor of the Panama Canal's salvage crew and himself a qualified diver, had been working continuously throughout the night to dig the tunnel, snake the cable under the submarine, and hook it to Ajax’s hoist. Now the lift began. As the crane took a strain, the lift cables broke. Shreaves and his crew worked another cable set under the bow and again Ajax pulled. Again, the cable broke. All through the day, the men worked. Shreaves had been in his diving suit nearly 24 hours. As noon on the 29th approached, the crane was ready for another lift, this time with buoyancy being added by blowing water out of the flooded Engine Room. Then, just after noontime, the bow of O-5 broke the surface. Men from the salvage force quickly opened the torpedo room hatch, and Breault and Brown emerged into the fresh air.

Brown's Account

Breault and I separated to pound on each of the boat’s sides. In this way, the rescuers would know that there were two of us. Breault played a kind of tune with his hammer, indicating to the diver that we were in good shape and cheerful. Neither of us knew Morse Code. We   had no food or water, and only a flashlight. We were confident we could stay alive for forty-eight hours. …The high pressure and foul air gave us severe headaches. We did very little moving or talking; it excited our hearts too much. …We heard scraping on the hull for hours. A couple of times we felt the O-5 being lifted, and then we got tossed roughly when the slings broke. We knew they were hard after us. This buoyed our hopes  for rescue tremendously. …Finally, the sub began to be tilted upward slowly. We felt we would escape this time, but it seemed like forever. The last 20 minutes were unbearable. We heard our comrades walking on deck. Breault opened the hatch and we could see daylight.  We were saved!!!

Aftermath
Lieutenant Harrison Avery was held responsible for the collision on 26 November 1923, but a later Court of Naval Inquiry cleared the O-5 of blame for the collision.

United States vs. United Fruit Company (Submarine O-5 – SS Abangarez) continued in the courts. Federal Judge Wayne G. Borah, New Orleans, on 20 August 1932, ruled O-5 was at fault in the collision.

References

Further reading

External links

On Eternal Patrol: USS O-5

United States O-class submarines
World War I submarines of the United States
United States submarine accidents
Lost submarines of the United States
Maritime incidents in 1923
Ships built in Quincy, Massachusetts
1917 ships
Shipwrecks in the Caribbean Sea
Submarines sunk in collisions